Mahishasuramarddini   is a widely popular early Bengali special dawn radio programme that has been broadcasting since 1931 on All India Radio (AIR) in Indian state West Bengal. It is a one-and-a-half-hour audio montage of Chaṇḍipāaṭh (chanting from Chaṇḍi) recitation from the scriptural verses of Śrī Śrī Chaṇḍi or Durga Saptashati, Bengali devotional songs, classical music and a dash of acoustic melodrama. The program has been translated into Hindi set to similar orchestration and is broadcast at the same time for a pan-Indian audience. This programme is aired every year at day-break on Mahalaya. The programme, which started off as a live-performance, has been broadcast in its pre-recorded format since 1966. However, its great popularity remains undiminished even today over 90 years later.

This program has become synonymous with Mahalaya which is celebrated to usher the Devipaksha lunar fortnight and the Durga Puja. To this day, most of Bengal and East Indians fond of the programme wakes up in the breezily pre dawn hours, 4 am to be precise, on the Mahalaya day to tune into the Mahishasuramarddini broadcast. Presently the recordings are available as audio cassettes and Compact Disks from HMV-RPG which has obtained the rights from All India Radio. The CD version (as of 2002) contains 19 tracks.

Birendra Krishna Bhadra
Birendra Krishna Bhadra, who will always be remembered for making Mahalaya memorable to one and all, is the voice behind the “Mahisasura Mardini.” He recites the holy verses and tells the story of the descent of Durga to earth. It was on the day of Mahalaya, the beginning of "Devipaksha", that the gods and goddesses woke up to prepare themselves for Durga Puja. In 1931, Mahalaya was first broadcast over the radio in Akashvani, Calcutta. The programme was organised by Pankaj Kumar Mallik, Premankur Aatorthi, Birendra Krishna Bhadra, Nripendra Krishna Mukhopadhyay and Raichand Boral.

So popular was his version of the recitation that when in 1976, the voice of noted Bengali actor, Uttam Kumar was employed for the programme and renamed it as Durga Durgatiharini did not get favorable response from the audience and it was shifted back to the original version of Birendra Krishna Bhadra.

Bhadra died long ago, but his recorded voice still forms the core of the Mahalaya program. In a sonorous voice Bhadra renders the Mahalaya recital for one and half thrilling hours, mesmerizing every household with the divine aura of his narration, as the Bengalis submerge their souls in quiet moments of prayer.

Musical composition
Though the theme is mythological and the mantras Vedic, this program is a landmark composition. It is scripted by Bani Kumar, and narrated by Birendra Krishna Bhadra while Pratima Bandopadhyay (Amala Kirane), Dwijen Mukhopadhyay (Jago Durga Jago Doshoprohoronodharini), Manabendra Mukhopadhyay (Tabo Achinta), Sandhya Mukhopadhyay, Arati Mukhopadhyay, Utpala Sen, Shyamal Mitra and Supriti Ghosh (Bajlo tomar alor benu) sang in their melodious voices. The enchanting music is composed by Pankaj Mullick. The songs/chants in the order they appear in the programme are as follows:

As the recital begins, the serene morning air resonates with the long drawn sound of the sacred conch shell, followed by a tune in Raga Malkosh, which ultimately leads to the start of the programme with the prayer to Goddess Chandi. Immediately an atmosphere is created full of assurance, respect and universal love and peace. This way, Mahisasurmardini took a permanent place in the heart of Bengali as well as Indian culture.

Artists

Main Artists
 Bani Kumar  - Script Writing
 Pankaj Mullick - Music Composition 
 Birendra Krishna Bhadra - Narration and Recitation of Scriptures

Singers

 Dwijen Mukhopadhyay (Jago Tumi Jago, Jago Durga, Jago Dashoprohoronadharini)
 Pratima Bandopadhyay (Amala Kirane)
 Shyamal Mitra (Subhro Sankha Robe)
 Sandhya Mukhopadhyay (Bimane Bimane Aloker Gaane)
 Manabendra Mukhopadhyay (Tabo Achintya)
 Arati Mukhopadhyay (Subhro Sankha Robe)
 Supriti Ghosh (Bajlo Tomar Alor Benu)
 Pankaj Kumar Mullick (Jayanti Mangala Kali & Aham Rudrebhirvasubhischara)
 Utpala Sen (Shanti Dile Bhori)
 Tarun Bandopadhyay (Hey Chinmoyi)
 Krishna Dasgupta (Akhilo Bimane Tabo Jayagaane)
 Sumitra Sen (Mago Tabo Bine)
 Ashima Bhattacharya (Subhro Sankha Robe)
 Shipra Bose (Ogo amar agomoni)
 Bimal Bhushan (Namo Chandi Namo Chandi)
 Dhananjay Bhattacharya (Rupang Dehi, Jayang Dehi)
 Haimanti Shukla (Aham Rudrebhirvasubhischara, Jago Dashoprohoronadharini)

Musicians(Instrument)
 Bibekendra Deb Roy violinist

References

 Pragya Paramita. "Heralding The Goddess", expressindia.com, Indian Express Newspapers (Mumbai) Ltd, 15 September 2006. Retrieved on 6 May 2007.
 Indranil Chakraborty. "Saregama gets going on Bhadra royalty, expressindia.com, Indian Express Newspapers (Mumbai) Ltd, September 26, 2006. Retrieved on 6 May 2007.
 "Mahalaya in Bengal", Mahalaya - Its Relation with the Durga Puja, NetGlimse.com. Retrieved on 6 May 2007.
 "Mahalaya", bangalinet.com. Retrieved on 6 May 2007.
 "Mahisasura Mardini by Birendra Krishna Bhadra (AIR Recording) – Details of tracks and artists", quiqinq.com. Retrieved on 21 October 2012.

External links
 Mahisasura Mardini Mahalaya
 Official Website of Kanaka Durgamma Temple 

Indian radio programmes
Durga Puja
All India Radio
1931 in India
Religious radio programs
Radio programs based on works
1931 radio programme debuts
Hindu music
Works based on religious texts